Laura Basuki (born 9 January 1988) is an Indonesian model and actress of mixed Javanese, Chinese and Vietnamese descent.

Early life
Basuki was born in Berlin on 9 January 1988 to an Indonesian-Chinese dad and a Vietnamese mom. As a teenager, she intended to be a doctor. However, her mother pressured her into becoming a model.

Career 
Her first modelling job was at a bridal pageant showing the works of Bijan Wanaatmadja. This was followed by spots marketing products including Coca-Cola and Vaseline. As the modelling work kept her too busy to study medicine, Basuki began studying economics.

In 2008, Basuki was cast in her first role, Gara-Gara Bola (Because of Football), after the producer Nia Dinata saw Basuki's face in a magazine. She played the role of a bookie's wife after a month of coaching. Gara-Gara Bola garnered her two awards at the 2009 Indonesian Movie Awards.

Two years later, Basuki played a Catholic woman in love with a Muslim man in Tiga Hati, Dua Dunia, Satu Cinta (Three Hearts, Two Worlds, One Love), which was a critical success. For her work, Basuki received a Citra Award for Best Actress at the 2010 Indonesian Film Festival. Also in 2010, Basuki served as an emcee hosting a quiz show for the MNC Group; the programme, broadcast during the 2010 FIFA World Cup, was about football.

Basuki married businessman Leo Sanjaya in 2011. In early 2012, she played a journalist in Agus Kuntz' film Republik Twitter (The Twitter Republic). Basuki's fourth film, Di Timur Matahari (East of the Sun), debuted on 12 June 2012. A children's movie directed by Ari Sihasale, it followed Basuki's character Vina as she moved to Papua with her Papuan husband. For the shooting, she spent over a month in the mountainous inner regions of the island, bathing only weekly.

In 2013 she was in a film entitled Madre, and followed by a role in 2015's film Love and Faith. Later, she starred as badminton legend Susi Susanti in 2019's biopic film Susi Susanti: Love All. For her portrayal of Susanti, Basuki won the Citra Award for Best Actress in 2020.

In 2022, Basuki starred in Kamila Andini's Before, Now & Then, a beguiling drama set in 1960s Indonesia. The film had its international premiere at the 72nd Berlin International Film Festival. At the festival, Basuki was honored with Silver Bear for Best Supporting Performance.

Filmography

Film

Webseries

FTV

Commercial 

 Lays
 Hadalabo
 Mandiri

Video clip

Awards and nominations

References

Sources

External links

1988 births
Living people
Citra Award winners
German people of Indonesian descent
German people of Vietnamese descent
German people of Chinese descent
German people of Javanese descent
Indonesian female models
Indonesian actresses
Indonesian Christians
Indonesian people of Vietnamese descent
Indonesian people of Chinese descent
Javanese people
Silver Bear for Best Supporting Performance winners